Candler Park is a 55-acre (223,000 m2) city park located at 585 Candler Park Drive NE, in Atlanta, Georgia, United States. It is named after Coca-Cola magnate Asa Griggs Candler, who donated this land to the city in 1922.  The park features a nine-hole golf course, a swimming pool, a football/soccer field, a basketball court, tennis courts, and a playground.

Candler Park is also the name of the neighborhood surrounding the park.  It is on the east side of the city, bordering Little Five Points, Lake Claire, Inman Park, Druid Hills, and Edgewood.
 
The Candler Park Historic District was listed on the National Register of Historic Places on September 8, 1983, with a boundary increase on March 17, 2005.  It includes portions of Lake Claire.

MARTA rapid transit rail service is available at the Edgewood/Candler Park station.

School districts
Public-school attendance zones include :
 Mary Lin Elementary School
 Samuel M. Inman Middle School
 Midtown High School

Gallery

See also
 Candler Building (Atlanta, Georgia)
 Candler Building (New York City)
 Candler Field
 National Register of Historic Places listings in DeKalb County, Georgia

References

External links 

Candler Park Fall Fest
 Candler Park Golf Course Review
Candler Park Neighborhood Organization
Candler Park Conservancy

Parks in Atlanta
Historic districts on the National Register of Historic Places in Georgia (U.S. state)
1922 establishments in Georgia (U.S. state)
Geography of DeKalb County, Georgia
Neighborhoods in Atlanta
Bungalow architecture in Georgia (U.S. state)
Candler family
National Register of Historic Places in Atlanta